Ashish Singh (born 25 December 1994) is an Indian first-class cricketer who plays for Railways. He made his Twenty20 debut for Railways in the 2016–17 Inter State Twenty-20 Tournament on 29 January 2017.

References

External links
 

1994 births
Living people
Indian cricketers
Railways cricketers
People from Uttar Pradesh